San Bartolo Yautepec Zapotec is an Oto-Manguean language of western Oaxaca, Mexico. It is a divergent Zapotec language, 10% intelligible with Tlacolulita Zapotec and not at all intelligible with other varieties. It is moribund, with all speakers born before 1955.

The ISO name is simply "Yautepec", but several other Zapotec languages go by that name.

References

Zapotec languages
Endangered Oto-Manguean languages
Endangered indigenous languages of the Americas